Gesvan-e Seh (also Romanized as Geşvān-e Seh and Gaswané Seh; also known as Gīsovān-e Seh and Gīsvān-e Seh) is a village in Veys Rural District, Veys District, Bavi County, Khuzestan Province, Iran. At the 2006 census, its population was 36, in 6 families.

References 

Populated places in Bavi County